Three ships of the United States Navy have been named Admiral.

, was the name of a Navy steamer before it was changed to USS Fort Morgan.
 A wooden-hulled motorboat built in 1913.  She served with the Navy and Coast Guard until she was destroyed by a fire in 1920.
 A wooden hulled steam yacht, originally named Red Cross.  She was taken over for the US Navy on 5 July 1917 and renamed USS Admiral (SP-967).

United States Navy ship names